Kenneth Edward Mellor (born 22 August 1934) is an English former professional footballer who played in the Football League for Mansfield Town and Swindon Town. Ken caught the eye of Leicester City scouts as a striker, scoring 99 goals in one season with Ashwell & Nesbitt, a works team from Barkby Road in Leicester. He was released by Leicester City without playing a first team game and was converted to a central defender by Mansfield Town manager Charlie Mitten due to his aerial ability.

References

1934 births
Living people
English footballers
Association football defenders
English Football League players
Leicester City F.C. players
Mansfield Town F.C. players
Swindon Town F.C. players
Hinckley Athletic F.C. players
Rugby Town F.C. players